The Kokolik River (Iñupiaq: Qaqalik) is a stream,  long, in the western North Slope of the U.S. state of Alaska.

Geography
It rises in the De Long Mountains of the western Brooks Range and flows generally north and northwest into the Kasegaluk Lagoon.

Its Inuit name, Qaqalik, refers to the alpine bistort, an edible plant found in the region. A variant name, Kepizetka (qipigsatqaq), recorded on an Inuit map in the late 19th century, means "it twists" or "crooked".

Geology

The river passes through the Nanushuk Formation in the westernmost National Petroleum Reserve in Alaska (NPR-A). The sandstone contains oil, which is thought to have been generated beneath Western North Slope and migrated northeastward into NPR-A.

History
In the summer of 1977, a tundra fire, apparently caused by lightning, affected  near the Kokolik River due east of Point Lay. Vegetation along the border of the National Petroleum Reserve burned during an exceptionally dry spell in the region. The site was the furthest north the Bureau of Land Management had ever fought a tundra fire.

See also
List of rivers of Alaska

References

Rivers of North Slope Borough, Alaska
Rivers of Alaska
Drainage basins of the Chukchi Sea